Citizens for Responsibility and Ethics in Washington and National Security Archive v. Trump and EOP, No. 1:17-cv-01228 (D.D.C. 2017), is a case pending before the United States District Court for the District of Columbia.  The plaintiffs, the watchdog group Citizens for Responsibility and Ethics in Washington (CREW) and the archivist National Security Archive, allege that the defendants, President Donald Trump and elements of the  Executive Office of the President, are in violation of the Presidential Records Act by deleting electronic messages on Twitter and using other electronic messaging applications without required archival records.

Background 
Citizens for Responsibility and Ethics in Washington (CREW) had previously filed an emoluments case against the president, CREW v. Trump, where they alleged the President had been in violation of the constitution since the inauguration. The National Security Archive at George Washington University is a  repository of declassified U.S. documents outside of the federal government. CREW and the National Security Archive are represented in this suit by both CREW staff lawyers and external counsel from the multinational law firm Baker McKenzie. The United States Department of Justice represents Trump. 

President Trump had used Twitter as a communication medium during his campaign and during his tenure as president, including tweets on inauguration day.  CREW contends that deletion of tweets is the destruction of presidential records in violation of the Presidential Records Act of 1981.

According to the text of the complaint:

Specific allegations
 Trump deleted tweets in violation of the Presidential Records Act of 1981.
 The White House used encrypted and auto-deleting messaging applications which CREW alleges interferes with other federal agencies from fulfilling their obligations.

Opinion 
The District Court ruled in favor of the Trump Administration, stating that the plaintiffs had failed to a clear and indisputable harm that merited the requested writ of mandamus. Thus, the case was dismissed and the administration was not required to restore the deleted communications. The plaintiffs appealed this decision, but the Court of Appeals for the D.C. Circuit affirmed the district court's ruling.

See also

 CREW v. Trump
 D.C. and Maryland v. Trump
 Blumenthal v. Trump
 List of lawsuits involving Donald Trump
 Presidential Records Act
 Freedom of Information Act

References

External links
 
 Copy of complaint filed in United States District Court (PDF, 38 pages)

United States District Court for the District of Columbia cases
Donald Trump and social media
Donald Trump litigation